(born October 29, 1976) is a beach volleyball player from Japan.

He represented Japan at the 2008 Summer Olympics and 2012 Summer Olympics with teammate Kentaro Asahi. He also participated in the 2020 Summer Olympics.

References

External links
 
 
 
 
 

1976 births
Living people
People from Ōta, Tokyo
People from Tokyo
Sportspeople from Tokyo
Japanese men's volleyball players
Japanese beach volleyball players
Beach volleyball players at the 2008 Summer Olympics
Beach volleyball players at the 2012 Summer Olympics
Olympic beach volleyball players of Japan
Asian Games gold medalists for Japan
Asian Games bronze medalists for Japan
Asian Games medalists in beach volleyball
Medalists at the 2002 Asian Games
Medalists at the 2010 Asian Games
Beach volleyball players at the 2002 Asian Games
Beach volleyball players at the 2006 Asian Games
Beach volleyball players at the 2010 Asian Games
Beach volleyball players at the 2018 Asian Games
Beach volleyball players at the 2020 Summer Olympics